Vidyapati is a 1937 Bengali biopic film directed by Debaki Bose for New Theatres. It starred Pahari Sanyal as  Vidyapati. His costars in the film were Kanan Devi, Prithviraj Kapoor, Chhaya Devi, Leela Desai, K. C. Dey and Kidar Sharma. The music was by R. C. Boral and lyrics by Kidar Sharma. Debaki Bose and Qazi Nazrul Islam wrote the story, screenplay and dialogues. The story is about the Maithili poet and Vaishnava saint  Vidyapati. The songs of the film became popular and the lyrics though encapsulating Vidyapati's poetry  were considered bold for its time. This however ensured the film garnered crowds at the theatres making it a big success of 1937.

Plot
King Shiva Singha (Prithviraj Kapoor) and His queen Lakshmi (Chhaya Devi) invite the poet Vidyapati (Pahari Sanyal) to their palace. He arrives with his constant companion Anuradha (Kanan Devi). The queen finds herself getting attracted to Vidyapati’s poetry and falls in love with him. This causes great anguish to the king who in his distress abandons his responsibilities and turns to Anuradha. The troubled Queen decides to kill herself and when the Prime Minister gets to hear of it he encourages her as he feels that Vidyapati’s sensuous bold poetry has had a detrimental effect on the king. The king, in the end, sends for his queen through Anuradha. He notices that she is lying there in the same position and starts crying realizing the queen is dead. Anuradha and Shiva try getting Lakshmi to get up without success.

Production
The film is thought to be Debaki Bose’s most adept directorial venture. The tight close-ups helped the narration of the story which focused on the poetry and songs. The films in those days tended to be heroine-centric and though the film was called Vidyapati the main star of the film was Kanan Devi. Her convincing performance became the main support of the film along with a strong script.

Critical reception 
Prithviraj Kapoor’s performance was rated high by Baburao Patel, the editor of Filmindia, while also appreciating the "newcomer" Mohammed Ishaq.  He called Debaki Bose’s direction a "fine poem of art" and Bose "truly a great director".

The film was used by Guru Dutt in his film Kaagaz Ke Phool (1959) as a tribute to the Studio Era by showing the character Suresh in the balcony of the theatre where Vidyapati is being watched by a packed audience.

Soundtrack 
The music director R. C. Boral brought in western influences by making use of the organ and piano in his music direction. The impact was successful with popular as well as classic tunes being used and the songs were highly appreciated. The role of Anuradha which Kanan Devi enacted was created by Nazrul Islam. Her songs like "More Angana Mein Aaye Aali" and her duets with K. C. Dey made her the top female singing star on par with K. L. Saigal at New Theatres. Kidar Sharma left New Theatres following differences between him and Debaki Bose but not before making a tremendous name for himself following his lyrics in Devdas (1935) and Vidyapati.

Track listing

References

External links

Vidyapati at indiancine.ma

1937 films
1930s Hindi-language films
Articles containing video clips
Indian black-and-white films
Indian biographical drama films
1930s biographical drama films
1937 drama films